William Hay, 10th Earl of Erroll PC (before 1597 – 7 December 1636) was a Scottish nobleman.

Biography
He was the eldest son of Francis Hay, 9th Earl of Erroll by his third wife, Lady Elizabeth, daughter of William Douglas, 6th Earl of Morton.

He was known as "Lord Hay". In January 1611, with the Earl of Pembroke and Lord Windsor, he escorted a French diplomat, the Marshal de Laverdin, from Croydon to Lambeth.

He succeeded to the earldom after his father's death in 1631. He became a member of the Privy Council on 28 May 1633. He also succeeded to the title of  Lord High Constable of Scotland, and took part in the Scottish coronation of King Charles I of Holyrood Abbey on 18 June 1633.

The earl lived such an extravagant lifestyle that he was forced to sell off the family's namesake lands in Errol, which had been granted to his forebearers by King William the Lion in the 12th century.

Marriage and issue

In September 1618, he married Anne Lyon, daughter of Patrick Lyon, 1st Earl of Kinghorne and Anne Murray. They had issue:

Gilbert Hay (13 June 1631 – 1674)
Lady Margaret, married 1638 Lord Henry Ker, son of Robert Ker, 1st Earl of Roxburghe; secondly in 1644; John Kennedy, 6th Earl of Cassilis

References

Bibliography

1590s births
1636 deaths
10
17th-century Scottish people
Members of the Privy Council of Scotland
William, 10